Laneellinae is a subfamily of Neotropical flies in the family Mesembrinellidae, and formerly placed in the Calliphoridae. There are 2 described species.

Genera & Species
Laneella Mello, 1967
L. nigripes Guimarães, 1977
L. perisi (Mariluis, 1987)

References

Mesembrinellidae
Diptera of South America
Diptera subfamilies